Eugenia verdoorniae is a species of plant in the family Myrtaceae. It is endemic to South Africa.  It is threatened by habitat loss.

References

Endemic flora of South Africa
verdoorniae
Near threatened plants
Taxonomy articles created by Polbot